National Resistance Front may refer to a number of political coalitions and parties:

 National Front (French Resistance)
 National Resistance Front (Honduras)
National Resistance Front of Afghanistan
 National Resistance Front of São Tomé and Príncipe
 National Resistance Front of São Tomé and Príncipe-Renewal

See also
 National Front (disambiguation)
 Popular front
 United front